Omar Andrés Narváez (born October 7, 1975) is an Argentine professional boxer. He is a two-weight world champion, having held the WBO flyweight title from 2002 to 2010, and the WBO junior bantamweight title from 2010 to 2014. As an amateur, Narváez represented Argentina at the 2000 Olympics, reaching the round of 16 of the super flyweight bracket.

Amateur career

He won the gold medal at the 1999 Pan American Games.
 1996 Olympian, as a flyweight. His results were:
 Defeated Joan Guzmán (Dominican Republic) 9-4
 Lost to Mehdi Assous (Algeria) 4-20
 1997 World Championships Bronze medalist in Budapest, HUN
 1998 South American Games Gold medalist
 1999 Pan American Games Gold medalist in Winnipeg, CAN, beat Manuel Mantilla (CUB) and José Navarro (USA)
 1999 World Championships Silver medalist in Houston, USA, beat Steve Molitor (CAN)
 2000 Olympian, as a flyweight. His results were:
 Defeated Carlos Valcárcel (Puerto Rico) 12-6
 Lost to Volodymyr Sydorenko (Ukraine) 10-16
 He is one of the rare foreign boxers who have won two medals (gold / bronze) at the prestigious international boxing tournament Giraldo Cordoba Cardin, which every year is celebrated in Cuba by invitation, Omar won gold in 1999 in Villa Clara, winning the final against Filipino Arlan Lily, in the semifinals had defeated the Guatemalan Castulo Gonzalez in 2000 won a bronze in the tournament in the province of Las Tunas, losing in the semifinals against the Thai Wijan Polit.

Professional career

He won the WBO world flyweight title on July 13, 2002 by a unanimous decision win over Adonis Rivas. He defended the title against 15 different contenders such as Luis Alberto Lazarate, Andrea Sarritzu, Everardo Morales, Alexander Mahmutov, Reginaldo Martins Carvalho, Bernard Inom, Rexon Flores, Walberto Ramos, Brahim Asloum, Marlon Marquez, Carlos Tamara, Iván Pozo, Alejandro "Payasito" Hernández, Rayonta Whitfield and Omar Soto.

He then moved up to Super Flyweight and won the WBO Super Flyweight title on May 15, 2010, with a unanimous points decision against Nicaraguan Everth Briceno in Buenos Aires, Argentina. That same year he won the Platinum Konex Award as the best boxer from the last decade in Argentina.

Narvaez faced Nonito Donaire on Oct. 22, 2011, at The Theater at Madison Square Garden at Bantamweight. He lost the one-sided fight by unanimous decision, his first professional loss.

He later returned to the super flyweight division where he won the WBO world super flyweight title and defended it against 11 boxers before getting knocked out by Naoya Inoue in the second round on December 30, 2014.

Narvaez vs. Potapov 
On 14 October 2017, Narvaez fought Nikolay Potapov who was ranked #2 by the WBO and #12 by the IBF at bantamweight. Narvaez won the fight via technical knockout in the 7th round.

Narvaez vs. Tete 
On 21 April 2018, Narvaez fought Zolani Tete for the WBO bantamweight title. Tete won by unanimous decision in their 12 round contest, 120-108, 120-108 on 120-108 on the judges' scorecards.

Records 
 Longest reigning world flyweight champion (7 years, 10 months)

Professional boxing record

See also 

List of flyweight boxing champions
List of super-flyweight boxing champions
Boxing at the 1996 Summer Olympics
Boxing at the 2000 Summer Olympics

References

External links

Omar Narvaez - Profile, News Archive & Current Rankings at Box.Live

1975 births
Living people
People from Trelew
Argentine people of Spanish descent
Flyweight boxers
Super-flyweight boxers
Bantamweight boxers
World flyweight boxing champions
World super-flyweight boxing champions
World Boxing Organization champions
Argentine male boxers
Olympic boxers of Argentina
Boxers at the 1996 Summer Olympics
Boxers at the 2000 Summer Olympics
Boxers at the 1999 Pan American Games
Pan American Games medalists in boxing
Pan American Games gold medalists for Argentina
AIBA World Boxing Championships medalists
Medalists at the 1999 Pan American Games